The .307 Winchester cartridge was introduced by Winchester in 1982 to meet the demand of .300 Savage performance in a lever-action rifle equipped with a tubular magazine. It is nearly dimensionally identical to the more common .308 Winchester cartridge, the only differences being a rimmed base and thicker case walls.

Overview
The Winchester Big Bore Model 94 Angle Eject rifle was the only rifle produced to fire the cartridge, though competitor Marlin Firearms created some prototype model 336 rifles chambered in .307 Win. It is still commercially loaded today, but many handload to gain better performance and accuracy. Because of safety concerns owing to the rifle's tubular magazine, flat-nosed bullets are normally used.

Specifications
180 gr (12 g) Super-X Power-Point bullet.
Ballistic Coefficient: 0.251

Dimensions

Child cartridges
The .307 Winchester is the parent case for the .356 Winchester, and the proprietary round 6.5 JDJ #2.

It is also the parent case for the 7mm STE (Shooting Times Eastern).

See also
 .308 Marlin Express
 List of rifle cartridges
 Table of handgun and rifle cartridges

References

External links

 The .307 Winchester by Chuck Hawks
 Pity The Poor .307 Winchester
 TFB Round Table: Is .307 Winchester Just .308 With a Typo?
 The .307 Winchester and .356 Winchester Lever-Action Cartridges
 

Pistol and rifle cartridges
Rimmed cartridges
Winchester Repeating Arms Company cartridges